The Light was a brass era automobile built in Detroit, Michigan by the Light Motor Car Company in 1913 and 1914.

History 
The Light, also called the Light Six, was a six-cylinder 30 hp car.  It came as a touring, demi-tonneau or roadster model, selling from $1,050 up to $1,250, . The company closed in 1914.

References

Defunct motor vehicle manufacturers of the United States
Motor vehicle manufacturers based in Michigan
Defunct manufacturing companies based in Michigan

Brass Era vehicles
1910s cars
Vehicle manufacturing companies established in 1913
Vehicle manufacturing companies disestablished in 1914
Cars introduced in 1913